Levopropylhexedrine (Eventin) is a psychostimulant used as an anorectic in Germany and patented by Smith Kline & French in 1947. It has also been used in the anticonvulsant preparation barbexaclone in combination with phenobarbital to offset sedation. Levopropylhexedrine is the levorotatory S-enantiomer of propylhexedrine. The dextrorotatory counterpart is known as dextropropylhexedrine.

See also 
 Barbexaclone
 Propylhexedrine

References 

Stimulants
Anorectics
Sympathomimetics
Amines
Enantiopure drugs
Euphoriants
Norepinephrine-dopamine releasing agents
Cyclohexyl compounds